Marie-Thérèse Renard (born 8 March 1925) is a Belgian former sprinter. She competed in the women's 100 metres at the 1948 Summer Olympics.

References

External links
 

1925 births
Possibly living people
Athletes (track and field) at the 1948 Summer Olympics
Belgian female sprinters
Olympic athletes of Belgium
Olympic female sprinters